Mark Colson is an American actor and former theatre professor at Michigan State University.

Education
Colson received his BFA at Webster University-Conservatory for the Performing Arts and his MFA from the National Theater Conservatory, Denver Center. He also studied at the Yale School of Drama and the British American Drama Academy in Oxford.

Career 
Colson's theatrical background includes work at The Denver Center, The Repertory Theatre of St. Louis, The Odyssey, Theatre Banshee in Los Angeles, The Hudson Theatre, The Boarshead Theatre, and The Sierra Repertory Theatre. In 2016, he played the role of Richard in the Purple Rose Theatre's world premiere of The Gaps in the Fossil Record Record.  He has also performed as Iago in the American Shakespeare Collective's Othello.

In 2008, Colson was nominated for an Ovation Award for his performance of "Slim" in Theater Banshee's Of Mice and Men.

In 1992, Colson's film career began with the recurring role of Gabriel in the television series Days of Our Lives. His film and TV work includes Clint Eastwood's Flags of Our Father, Mad Men, Demolition Man, Bones, and with Amy Poehler on Parks and Recreation.

Colson also used professional motion capture to play George A. Romero in the 2010 video game Call of the Dead.

Colson worked as a film and theater professor at Michigan State University.  In 2015, he pioneered the Theatre2Film project which gives filmmaking and theater students a hands-on learning experience. A student-written piece is performed as a stage play then transformed into a screenplay to be acted by the same students.

Filmography

Theatrical resume (since 2008)

Union affiliations
Actor's Equity Association: 1990 – present
SAG-AFTRA: 1993 – present

References

External links
 

American male actors
Michigan State University faculty
Living people
Year of birth missing (living people)